Johannes Walaeus (born Jan de Wale; also known as Johannes de Wale; 1604–1649) was a Dutch physician and illustrious professor at the Faculty of Medicine in Leiden University.
He was graduated Doctor of Medicine in 1631, when he defended his dissertation, entitled Disputiatio medica de febribus at Leiden University. Two years after that, he was nominated Professor extraordinarius. In 1648, he was offered full professorship at Leiden University. Johannes Walaeus was a son of the theologian Antonius Walaeus.

Publications
Walaeus, Johannes (1677). Iohannis Walaei Epistulae duae: De motu chyli, et sanguinis

References

1604 births
1649 deaths
17th-century Dutch physicians
Leiden University alumni